François XIII, duke of La Rochefoucauld (8 September 1765, Paris - 3 September 1848) was the heir and eldest son of François Alexandre Frédéric, duc de la Rochefoucauld-Liancourt. On 24 September 1793 he married Marie-Françoise de Tott (1770–1854) at The Hague. Their daughter, Fanny, was one of the mistresses of Anatoly Nikolaievich Demidov, 1st Prince of San Donato, and bore him an illegitimate child.

Among his works are Mélanges sur l’Angleterre (a travel memoir) and Souvenirs du 10 Aoȗt 1792 et de l’Armée de Bourbon. The former has twice been translated into English: first in 1933 as A Frenchman in England, 1784 (translated by S.C. Roberts); and subsequently as A Frenchman's Year in Suffolk, 1784 (translated by Norman Scarfe).

1765 births
1848 deaths
Dukes of La Rochefoucauld